Sheikh Jaber al-Ahmad Al-Sabah (29 June 1926 – 15 January 2006) was Emir of Kuwait and Commander of the Kuwait Military Forces from 31 December 1977 until his death in 2006.

The third monarch to rule Kuwait since its independence from Britain, Jaber had previously served as minister of finance and economy from 1962 to 1965 when he was appointed prime minister prior to becoming Kuwait's ruler. He was the 13th ruler in the family dynasty.

Early life and education 
Jaber was born on 29 June 1926 in Kuwait City. He  was the third son of Ahmad Al-Jaber Al-Sabah.

Jaber received his early education at Al-Mubarakiya School, Al-Ahmediya School, and Al-Sharqiya School, and was subsequently tutored privately in English, Arabic, religion and the sciences.

His brother Fahad Al-Ahmed Al-Jaber Al-Sabah was killed in 1990 in the Gulf War in front of Dasman Palace.

Career

Early career 

In 1962, he was appointed as Kuwait's minister of finance when the ministry was established. In this position, Jaber was tasked with putting the new Kuwaiti dinar into circulation and establishing the Kuwaiti Currency Board, of which he was the chair. As minister, Jaber adopted, and was the first chairman of, the Kuwaiti Fund for Arab Economic Development from 1962 to 1964. The Fund provides financial and technical assistance to developing countries. The country's oil revenues transformed it from a largely rural seafaring society to a modern state. During this time, the Fund expanded to aid five countries and gave loans to another eight. The money going into the fund came from oil earnings.

After Iraq claimed sovereignty over Kuwait in 1961, following independence from Great Britain, Al-Sabah led a delegation to the Arab League to resolve the issue. The United Kingdom informed Iraqi Prime Minister Abd al-Karim Qasim that it would militarily assist Kuwait in the event of military action, leading to Operation Vantage. Iraq recognised Kuwait's independence in 1963, though it disputed the borders.

Iran–Iraq War 
Kuwait found itself geographically in the middle of the Iran–Iraq War that took place from 1980 to 1988. Throughout the war, the country suffered from many security threats, including a series of bombings. In 1986, one year after an attack on Jaber's motorcade, there was an attack on an oil installation, which almost caused the shutdown of Kuwait's oil industry.

Gulf War 

Some sources claim that the task of the invading Iraqi forces was to capture or kill Jaber. However, such a claimed plan was not possible with the exile of Jaber and his government to Saudi Arabia within hours of the invasion where they ran the Kuwaiti exiled government from a hotel in Ta'if, Saudi Arabia.

From Ta'if, Jaber set up his government so that its ministers were in communication with the people still in Kuwait. The government was able to direct an underground armed resistance made up of both military and civilian forces and was able to provide public services to the Kuwaiti people who remained, such as emergency care through the funds that it had saved from oil revenues. In the meantime, Jaber and his government lobbied to receive military support action against Iraq before and during the Gulf War. When the war ended on 28 February 1991, Jaber remained in Saudi Arabia while declaring three months of martial law, causing the accusation that he was trying to monopolize too much power for the small constitutional monarchy. He returned to Kuwait in March 1991, after American-led efforts to restore his rule and remove the Iraqi army. By imposing martial law, government officials were able to ensure that there were no Iraqis still in Kuwait who may have attempted to once again overthrow the government. They were also tasked with making sure that the country was safe enough for Jaber and his government to return, which they eventually did on 15 March 1991.

On 15 March 1991, Sheikh Jaber al-Ahmad al-Sabah returned to Kuwait, staying at the private home of a wealthy Kuwaiti as his own palace had been destroyed. He was met with a symbolic arrival with several dozens cars filled with people honking their car horns and waving Kuwaiti flags who tried to follow the Emir's convoy.

2003 US invasion of Iraq 

During the 2003 US invasion of Iraq, and unlike the ruling family of Saudi Arabia, Jaber openly allowed the United States to use Kuwait as a base.

Personal life and death 

Al-Sabah had at least 4 wives by 1997, and 7 children.

In September 2001, Jaber suffered from a stroke and went to the United Kingdom for treatment. He died on 15 January 2006, aged 79, from the cerebral hemorrhage that he had suffered in 2001 and was succeeded by the Crown Prince Saad Al-Abdullah Al-Salim Al-Sabah. The government announced a 40-day period of mourning and closed office for three days.<ref>Slackman, Michael and Neil MacFarquhar. Just a few days earlier, Maktoum bin Rashid Al Maktoum, the ruler from nearby Dubai, had died. "Sheik Jaber al-Ahmad al-Sabah, the Leader of Kuwait for 28 Years, is Dead at 79", 'The New York Times, 16 January 2006. Retrieved 30 November 2009.</ref> Bahrain has declared forty days of mourning; Jordan announced seven days of mourning; Yemen, Egypt, Iraq, Algeria, Oman, Syria, Pakistan, Mauritius and State of Palestine all declared three days of mourning; India declared one day of mourning. He was buried at Sulaibikhat Cemetery alongside his kin.

 See also 
 House of Al-Sabah
 Flag of Kuwait

 Further reading 
 Hassan, Hamdi A. (1999), The Iraqi Invasion of Kuwait: Religion, Identity and Otherness in the Analysis of War and Conflict'' (Series: Critical Studies on Islam); New York: Pluto (UK).

References 

1926 births
2006 deaths
House of Al-Sabah
Prime Ministers of Kuwait
Rulers of Kuwait
Finance ministers of Kuwait
Muslim monarchs
Honorary Knights Grand Cross of the Order of the Bath
Honorary Knights Grand Cross of the Order of St Michael and St George
Government ministers of Kuwait
Grand Croix of the Légion d'honneur
Grand Cordons of the National Order of the Cedar
First Class of the Order of the Star of Romania
Recipients of orders, decorations, and medals of Sudan